Wayward Pines is an American mystery science fiction television series based on the Wayward Pines novels by Blake Crouch. Developed for television by Chad Hodge, the pilot was directed by M. Night Shyamalan, with both as executive producers. The series premiered on Fox on May 14, 2015, and the first season concluded on July 23, 2015.

On December 9, 2015, Fox renewed the series for a second season which aired from May 25 to July 27, 2016. After the second season, the series was canceled in 2018.

Premise
In the first season, Ethan Burke (Matt Dillon) is a U.S. Secret Service agent investigating the disappearance of two fellow agents in the mysterious small town of Wayward Pines, Idaho. Ethan awakens from a car accident unable to contact the outside world and unable to leave. He finds one of the agents dead and the other, his former lover Kate Hewson (Carla Gugino), settled down in the seemingly idyllic town. But the inhabitants of Wayward Pines are trapped there by an electrified fence and set of rules enforced by the strict Sheriff Arnold Pope (Terrence Howard). Any attempt to escape is punished by a public execution known as a "reckoning", when the Sheriff slits the condemned's throat. Ethan reconnects with his wife and son while working to discover the truth.

In the second season, Dr. Theo Yedlin (Jason Patric) is a surgeon who is caught in the battle between Jason Higgins (Tom Stevens), leader of the First Generation that took over Wayward Pines following the Abbie incident that closed season 1, and the underground rebels led by Ethan's son Ben Burke (Charlie Tahan).

Cast and characters

 Matt Dillon as Ethan Burke (season 1)
 Carla Gugino as Kate Hewson (main season 1, guest season 2)
 Toby Jones as David Pilcher, alias Dr. Jenkins (main season 1, recurring season 2)
 Shannyn Sossamon as Theresa Burke (main season 1, recurring season 2)
 Reed Diamond as Harold Ballinger (season 1)
 Charlie Tahan as Ben Burke (main season 1, recurring season 2)
 Juliette Lewis as Beverly Brown (season 1)
 Tim Griffin as Adam Hassler
 Melissa Leo as Pamela "Pam" Pilcher (main season 1, guest season 2)
 Terrence Howard as Sheriff Arnold Pope (main season 1, guest season 2)
 Jason Patric as Dr. Theodore "Theo" Yedlin (season 2)
 Nimrat Kaur as Rebecca Yedlin (season 2) 
 Josh Helman as Xander Beck (season 2)
 Tom Stevens as Jason Higgins (recurring season 1, main season 2)
 Kacey Rohl as Kerry Campbell (season 2)
 Hope Davis as Megan Fisher (recurring season 1, main season 2)
 Djimon Hounsou as Christopher James "C.J." Mitchum (season 2)
 Christopher Meyer as Mario (season 2)
 Michael Garza as Frank Armstrong (season 2)

Production
Wayward Pines was executive produced by Chad Hodge with M. Night Shyamalan, Donald De Line, and Ashwin Rajan. The pilot episode was written by Hodge and directed by Shyamalan. The series was officially picked up on May 13, 2013, with a ten-episode order. Filming took place between August 19, 2013, and February 14, 2014, in Burnaby (interiors) and Agassiz (exteriors), in British Columbia.

The plot of Crouch's first novel in the trilogy, Pines (2012), is covered over the first five episodes of the TV series. The second and third novels, Wayward (2013) and The Last Town (2014), make up the remaining five episodes. After reading the source material, Shyamalan said of the project, "As long as everybody isn't dead, I'm in" — his "only rule" to secure his participation. He noted that the TV series varies from the books in some ways, but as Crouch was still writing the novels while the show was in development, there was "all kinds of cross pollinating" between the two. In June 2015, Deadline Hollywood reported that Fox was considering a second season based on the series' impressive ratings. Though Hodge asserted that, from a creative standpoint, "Wayward Pines was always designed to be just these 10 episodes" in concert with the plotline of the books, he allowed for the possibility of another season. He said that in the finale viewers would "see a window to that, but it also is a complete ending as it is."

With the tenth episode having been billed as the "series finale", the show was effectively finished. However, on December 9, 2015, Fox renewed Wayward Pines for a second season, to premiere in mid-2016. After the conclusion of the first season, Chad Hodge stepped down from his position as showrunner and executive producer for the series. Mark Friedman succeeded Hodge as showrunner for season two. Season two has a largely new main cast, with several lead actors from season one either not returning at all or appearing only as recurring characters in the second season. This is in part because a few actors  notably Terrence Howard and Juliette Lewis  committed to other projects in the time between the filming and the airing of Season One.

Episodes

Season 1 (2015)

Season 2 (2016)

Broadcast
On May 12, 2014, Fox announced that Wayward Pines would premiere in 2015 as mid-season replacement. The series was picked up for broadcast by Fox in the United Kingdom, and by FX in Australia from May 14, 2015, where the premiere was the second most watched program on subscription television with 101,000 viewers.

Fox made the pilot available on demand and through various online outlets from April 23 to 30, 2015, in what the network called "the first-ever global preview event". The series subsequently debuted on May 14, 2015, simultaneously in more than 126 countries in what Fox called "the world's largest day-and-date launch for a scripted series ever". Due to time zones, episodes of the first season aired first in Australia.

Digital companion series
A digital companion series, also produced by Fox, aired alongside the weekly episodes of Wayward Pines, titled Gone and written and directed by Christopher Leone. The series follows Eric Barlow, a rocket scientist, as he searches for his missing wife Sarah, a journalist, after she leaves a goodbye message and leaves him. He finds himself led toward a mountain in Idaho with the help of Sarah's colleague Elena, where he finds a man involved in the construction of Wayward Pines. Arriving at the site, a technician leads him to Sarah who is frozen in a prototype chamber, but it is really him they were after.

Reception
The first season of Wayward Pines has received mostly favorable reviews from critics. On Rotten Tomatoes it holds a rating of 78%, based on 77 reviews. The site's critical consensus reads, "Creepy and strange in the best way possible, Wayward Pines is a welcome return to form for M. Night Shyamalan." The fifth episode, "The Truth", received an individual rating of 83%, based on 12 reviews. On Metacritic, the first season has a score of 66 out of 100, based on 34 critics for season 1 "generally favorable reviews". 

The second season however, received mixed reception from critics on Rotten Tomatoes with a rating of 43%, based on 14 reviews. The site's critical consensus reads, "Wayward Pines drifts away from the intrigue and mystery established during its debut season, slipping into a dull, repetitive, and trite narrative."

Awards and nominations

References

External links
 
 
 
 
 

2015 American television series debuts
2016 American television series endings
2010s American drama television series
2010s American science fiction television series
2010s American mystery television series
Nonlinear narrative television series
Cryonics in fiction
Dystopian television series
Works by M. Night Shyamalan
English-language television shows
Fictional populated places in Idaho
Fox Broadcasting Company original programming
Post-apocalyptic television series
Suicide in television
Television shows based on American novels
Television series by 20th Century Fox Television
Television shows filmed in British Columbia
Television series set in the future
Fiction set in the 5th millennium
Television shows set in Idaho
Television shows featuring audio description